The Hawaiian Poi Dog ( or ʻīlio mākuʻe) is an extinct breed of pariah dog from Hawaiʻi which was used by Native Hawaiians as a spiritual protector of children and as a source of food.

History 

The original Hawaiian poi dog were descended from the Polynesian dogs brought to the Hawaiian Islands by the Polynesian people. Genetic studies on the New Zealand Kurī dog indicate that the origin of this dog (and therefore probably the Hawaiian dog) is Indonesia. Referred as the ʻīlio in the Hawaiian language, the modern name of this breed is derived from poi, a Hawaiian staple food made from kalo or taro root. Poi was used to fatten the dogs for use as food because meat was too valuable to be used as dog food. Since the Hawaiian Islands did not have large land mammals other than feral hogs, Poi dogs were not needed for hunting. The dogs were never deliberately bred to a standard, but human and natural selection still came into play.

European explorers like Captain Cook encountered pot-bellied, short-legged poi dogs that freely associated with hogs in the village. The dogs had very short hair that could come in any color, but brown poi dogs were regarded as distinct enough to warrant a specific name. The dogs also had peculiarly flattened heads. The latter trait is sometimes ascribed to the diet of the dogs in some unspecified way. Considering that poi does not require chewing, the dogs may have lost the need to maintain strong temporalis muscles; a reduced temporal fossa will cause a dog's head to appear flattened. Poi dogs were considered rather dim-witted and sluggish – any good hunting dog with acute senses would neither make a good poi dog nor be particularly useful on the islands – however, the dogs were strong-willed and not easily commanded.

The poi dog was a two-purpose breed – used for food and as a lucky charm. Unsuited for anything else, the breed declined to extinction as the native religion was abandoned and eating dog meat became unfashionable. Feral dogs of European settlers interbred with the poi dogs, and by the early 20th century at latest, the breed disappeared as a distinct entity.

Surviving depictions

No surviving artwork or photograph from Hawaiian history are authentically attributed as poi dogs. Often Western artists infused Euro-American characteristics in their 18th-century depictions of the dogs of Polynesia and by the 19th century, the dogs being depicted were of foreign breeds. The lack of details has led historians to guess at what works may be realistic depictions of the breed based on the physical characteristics.

Writers Katharine Luomala and Margaret Titcomb both agreed an unfinished line drawing, dated to c. 1816–17, by French artist Louis Choris, who was part of the exploring expedition of Otto von Kotzebue, may show one of the dogs in center which may resemble the extinct breed. Luomala also claims French artist Barthélémy Lauvergne possibly captured a dog with the same traits in his colored drawing of Honolulu Harbor in 1836.

Ancient Hawaiian petroglyphs depict simplified representations of the dogs. They often show the curly tails and pointed ears characteristic of the breed.

Breeding program 

In 1967, Jack L. Throp, director of the Honolulu Zoo, attempted to bring back the breed through selective breeding of local dogs based on morphological characteristics. The project studied 18th- and 19th-century descriptions of the dog before 1825 and also the surviving skeletal remains of the ancient breed to set a standard. From this, they selected local dogs in Hawaii, who were then bred for the desired traits. By the third generation from the original dogs selected in the program, a female was born with the desired appearance of the ancient breed.
Commenting in 1969, Throp noted:
The Honolulu Zoo undertook a project in 1967 to re-create the Polynesian dog. The purpose behind such a project is to tell the story of the animal life of the Hawaiian Islands in a living Hawaiian exhibit. The dog is an important part of the Polynesians' contribution to this story.

The program is thought to have discontinued shortly afterward. In 1976, the crews on the Hōkūleʻa on their expedition to recreate the historical Polynesian voyage between Hawaii and Tahiti brought along a dog from this program, which they named Hoku.

Usage 
Today, the term "poi dog" is most often used to refer to mutts or mixed breed dogs, but also attribute specific characteristics to poi dogs, including the ability to eat anything, a strong will, and a unique appearance composed of different breeds. The term "poi dog" is also colloquially used to describe people of mixed heritage, although the more common term in use is hapa.

See also 
Kurī – breed of Polynesian dog native to New Zealand
List of dog breeds
List of extinct dog breeds
Marquesan Dog – breed of Polynesian dog native to the Marquesas Islands
Tahitian Dog - breed of Polynesian dog native to Tahiti in the Society Islands

Footnotes and references

Bibliography

Further reading

External links 

 Photographs of Hawaiian dog petroglyphs by Jean Charlot
 Photographs of Hawaiian dog petroglyphs at Nuʻuanu, Oʻahu by Christopher M. Butin

Extinct dog breeds
Dog breeds originating in the United States
Extinct Hawaiian animals
Dog meat
Native Hawaiian culture
Polynesian Dog
Mammals of Hawaii